Dzmitry Alyaksandrovich Chaley (born 14 February 1978) is a retired Belarusian professional footballer. After retiring, he worked as a youth coach.

Career

In 2001, Chaley left Slavia Mozyr for Ružomberok in Slovakia. In 2004, he said that "What caught my eye [in Slovakia] was the abundance of tough game - the fight on the field was conducted until the last second of the match. To master after the “Slavia”, where they practiced technical, combination football, was not easy. In principle, the level of the Slovak championship is low. I’m sure that “Slavia” could claim medals in it."

Honours
Slavia Mozyr
 Belarusian Premier League champion: 2000
 Belarusian Cup winner: 1999–2000

Dinamo Minsk
 Belarusian Premier League champion: 2004

References

External links

1978 births
Living people
Belarusian footballers
Association football midfielders
Belarusian expatriate footballers
Belarusian expatriate sportspeople in Slovakia
Belarusian expatriate sportspeople in Russia
Expatriate footballers in Slovakia
Expatriate footballers in Russia
Russian Premier League players
Slovak Super Liga players
FC Molodechno players
FC Dinamo-93 Minsk players
FC Slavia Mozyr players
MFK Ružomberok players
FC Rostov players
FC Torpedo Minsk players
FC Dinamo Minsk players
FC Shakhtyor Soligorsk players
FC Granit Mikashevichi players
FC Vitebsk players
FC Gorodeya players